Shōnai is a town in Yamagata Prefecture, Japan.

Shōnai may also refer to:

Shōnai, Fukuoka, a former town in Fukuoka Prefecture
Shōnai, Ōita, a former town in Ōita Prefecture
Shōnai Domain, an Edo period domain
Shōnai River, a river in Gifu Prefecture and Aichi Prefecture

See also
 Shōnai Station (disambiguation)